{{DISPLAYTITLE:C7H9NO}}
The molecular formula C7H9NO may refer to:

 4-Amino-m-cresol 
Anisidines
o-Anisidine (2-methoxyaniline)
m-Anisidine (3-methoxyaniline)
p-Anisidine (4-methoxyaniline)